The Markham Regional Arboretum is a natural arboretum located at 1202 La Vista Avenue, Concord, California, United States.

History
Ira and "Bee" Markham, the original owners of the property, sold the parcel of land to the city of Concord in 1966.  They requested that the area be kept as natural as possible, growing primarily local plants and trees for the area's residents to enjoy.

Markham Nature Park
Located closest to Cowell Road is the Markham Nature Park and Science Center. This park has an old farmhouse, used now as a classroom for GATE (Gifted and Talented Education) students. For one week at a time, GATE students come to the park and learn about the surroundings, and other science related topics. The students go on hikes and learn about the trees and birds, take a day to collect samples from Galindo Creek which flows through the park, and care for the many animals that reside in the Markhams' old farmhouse. The animals range from snakes to mice to turtles, and a toad named "Alligator" who lives in the bathtub. For the night, most of the children receive an assigned animal, taking it home and caring for it.

See also
 List of botanical gardens in the United States

External links
Markham Nature Park and Arboretum official site

Botanical gardens in California
Arboreta in California
Concord, California
Protected areas of Contra Costa County, California
Education in Contra Costa County, California